Eclipso: The Darkness Within was a 1992 comic book miniseries and crossover storyline published by DC Comics. It featured the heroes of the DC Universe fighting against Eclipso. Issue #1 debuted July 1992, and was created and co-plotted by Robert Loren Fleming and Keith Giffen. Keith Giffen also did pencil layouts for the series, and Bart Sears provided the finished artwork.

History
Within this series it was retconned that Eclipso was not simply Bruce Gordon's dark half, but a vengeance demon who had possessed Gordon.

Plot
After an unsuspecting Daxamite hero named Valor frees Eclipso from his palace on Earth's moon, he uses hate as a trigger to possess other beings. Whenever someone who has a black diamond in their possession gets angry, Eclipso can instantly take control of that particular person, even while trapped in his lair on the moon. He then uses an eyeblast to take control of others. He can also create monsters from a person's anger, which happens with characters like Hawkman and James Gordon. Furthermore, there are thousands of black diamonds scattered around the world, through which Eclipso can possess his victims by playing upon their darkest emotions and desires. 

It is further established that Eclipso is an extremely cruel and vindictive being, who has only been pretending to be a B-list villain in order to avoid detection by the heroes. In the miniseries, Eclipso has grown weary of his modus operandi and decides to launch an all-out offensive by using his black diamonds to possess the heroes and villains directly, or to manipulate them by possessing their loved ones. During this conflict, Eclipso possesses Batman, Captain Marvel and even Superman on two separate occasions. The story climaxes with a massive confrontation at Eclipso's hideout on the moon, where, despite the presence of many superpowered heroes and heroines, Bruce Gordon, Eclipso's original host, plays a key role in his defeat.

It was also mocked in the Ambush Bug Nothing Special one-shot.

Crossover titles
 Part 1: Eclipso: The Darkness Within #1
 Part 2: Superman: The Man of Steel Annual #1
 Part 3: Green Lantern Annual (vol. 3) #1 
 Part 4: Detective Comics Annual #5
 Part 5: Superman Annual (vol. 2) #4 
 Part 6: Justice League America Annual #6
 Part 7: Demon Annual (vol. 3) #1 
 Part 8: Flash Annual (vol. 2) #5 
 Part 9: Action Comics Annual #4
 Part 10: Wonder Woman Annual (vol. 2) #3 
 Part 11: Green Arrow Annual (vol. 2) #5 
 Part 12: Robin Annual (vol. 4) #1 
 Part 13: Hawkworld Annual (vol. 2) #3 
 Part 14: Deathstroke, the Terminator Annual #1
 Part 15: The New Titans Annual #8
 Starman #42-45
 Part 16: Justice League Europe Annual #3
 Part 17: Batman Annual #16
 Part 18: L.E.G.I.O.N. '92 Annual #3
 Part 19: Adventures of Superman Annual #4
 Part 20: Eclipso: The Darkness Within #2
 Aftermath: Valor #1
 Eclipso #1-18 and Annual #1

References

External links
 Eclipso: The Darkness Within at the DC Database Project
 DCU Guide: Eclipso, The Darkness Within #1
 DCU Guide: Eclipso, The Darkness Within #2